New Ebenezer is a hamlet in the town of West Seneca in Erie County, New York, United States.

See also
Ebenezer, New York

References

Hamlets in New York (state)
Hamlets in Erie County, New York